Poecilomigas is a genus of spiders in the family Migidae. It was first described in 1903 by Simon. , it contains 3 African species.

References

Migidae
Mygalomorphae genera
Spiders of Africa